Alec Whaites (born 1884) was an English professional footballer who played as an outside left.

Career
Whaites spent his early career with New Brighton Tower and Linfield. He signed for Bradford City from Linfield in May 1904, and made 12 league and 1 FA Cup appearances for the club, before moving to Oldham Athletic in September 1907.

Sources

References

1884 births
Date of death missing
English footballers
New Brighton Tower F.C. players
Linfield F.C. players
Bradford City A.F.C. players
Oldham Athletic A.F.C. players
English Football League players
Association football outside forwards